The 2007 Libyan SuperCup took place between 2006–07 Libyan Premier League champions Al Ittihad and the 2007 Libyan Cup runners-up Al Akhdar (Al Ittihad won the Libyan Cup, so Al Akhdar took their place in the competition as cup runners-up). This was the 11th edition of the competition, and the match ended 3–1 to Al Ittihad after extra time. This was Al Ittihad's 6th consecutive win in the competition.

Match details

References

Libyan Super Cup
Super Cup